Te Kowhai is a small rural town situated 15 km north west of Hamilton City in New Zealand. It consists of mainly dairy and cattle farms and also includes a small dairy/takeaway, fresh vegetable and fruit store, cafe, bakery, a large park with a playground and skate park, and mechanics shop. Te Kowhai Aerodrome is situated near the township. The town is popular for new subdivisions.

Demographics
Te Kowhai settlement is part of the larger Te Kowhai statistical area.

Te Kowhai settlement had a population of 492 at the 2018 New Zealand census, an increase of 60 people (13.9%) since the 2013 census, and an increase of 102 people (26.2%) since the 2006 census. There were 189 households, comprising 222 males and 270 females, giving a sex ratio of 0.82 males per female, with 111 people (22.6%) aged under 15 years, 60 (12.2%) aged 15 to 29, 213 (43.3%) aged 30 to 64, and 114 (23.2%) aged 65 or older.

Ethnicities were 90.9% European/Pākehā, 15.2% Māori, 1.2% Pacific peoples, 1.8% Asian, and 3.7% other ethnicities. People may identify with more than one ethnicity.

Although some people chose not to answer the census's question about religious affiliation, 50.6% had no religion, 39.6% were Christian and 1.8% had other religions.

Of those at least 15 years old, 75 (19.7%) people had a bachelor's or higher degree, and 90 (23.6%) people had no formal qualifications. 87 people (22.8%) earned over $70,000 compared to 17.2% nationally. The employment status of those at least 15 was that 168 (44.1%) people were employed full-time, 63 (16.5%) were part-time, and 6 (1.6%) were unemployed.

Te Kowhai statistical area

Te Kowhai statistical area had a population of 2,061 at the 2018 New Zealand census, an increase of 315 people (18.0%) since the 2013 census, and an increase of 552 people (36.6%) since the 2006 census. There were 711 households, comprising 1,008 males and 1,053 females, giving a sex ratio of 0.96 males per female. The median age was 41.2 years (compared with 37.4 years nationally), with 489 people (23.7%) aged under 15 years, 300 (14.6%) aged 15 to 29, 957 (46.4%) aged 30 to 64, and 315 (15.3%) aged 65 or older.

Ethnicities were 91.3% European/Pākehā, 12.7% Māori, 0.7% Pacific peoples, 2.3% Asian, and 1.9% other ethnicities. People may identify with more than one ethnicity.

The percentage of people born overseas was 10.8, compared with 27.1% nationally.

Although some people chose not to answer the census's question about religious affiliation, 56.5% had no religion, 35.4% were Christian, 0.3% had Māori religious beliefs, 0.1% were Muslim, 0.1% were Buddhist and 1.7% had other religions.

Of those at least 15 years old, 303 (19.3%) people had a bachelor's or higher degree, and 309 (19.7%) people had no formal qualifications. The median income was $39,500, compared with $31,800 nationally. 414 people (26.3%) earned over $70,000 compared to 17.2% nationally. The employment status of those at least 15 was that 867 (55.2%) people were employed full-time, 261 (16.6%) were part-time, and 36 (2.3%) were unemployed.

Education
Te Kowhai School is a coeducational full primary (years 1-8) school with a roll of  students as of  The school opened in 1890, and moved to its present site in 1900.

See also
 Micro Aviation NZ, manufacturer based in the town

References

Waikato District
Populated places in Waikato